Bārta Parish is an administrative unit of South Kurzeme Municipality in the Courland region of Latvia. The parish has a population of 683 (as of 1/07/2010) and covers an area of 115.6 km2.

Villages of Bārta parish 
 Bārta
 Krūte
 Ķīburi
 Plosti

References

Parishes of Latvia
South Kurzeme Municipality
Courland